Central Standard Time may refer to:

 Central Standard Time (North America), UTC−06:00
 Australian Central Standard Time, UTC+09:30
 Central Standard Time/Vasil + Bluey, a split EP between bands The Get Up Kids and The Anniversary